Fox 21 may refer to:

Television stations in the United States:
 WHNS Greenville, South Carolina
 WFXR Roanoke, Virginia (as "Fox 21/27")
 KXRM-TV Colorado Springs, Colorado
 KQDS-TV Duluth, Minnesota
 WBOC-DT2, Salisbury, Maryland

Other uses:
 Fox 21 Television Studios, a unit of 20th Television